The KrAZ-260 is an off-road truck 6x6 for extreme operations. It was manufactured at the KrAZ plant.

Technical characteristics 
Engine: 14.86 L diesel 8 cyl.
Power: 300 PS /2100rpm
Torque: 1079Nm /1500rpm
Top speed: 80 km/h

Variants 

 KrAZ-260 (КрАЗ-260) - 9-ton cargo truck
 KrAZ-260V (КрАЗ-260В) - tractor unit
 KrAZ-260G (КрАЗ-260Г)
 KrAZ-6437 (КрАЗ-6437) - 30-ton log truck
 ATs-10-260 (АЦ-10-260) - fuel tanker on KrAZ-260 chassis
 KrAZ-260 "Tornado" (КрАЗ-260 "Торнадо") - riot control vehicle with water cannon on KrAZ-260 chassis. Two vehicles were built for Internal Troops of Ukraine
 BM-21K (БМ-21К) - BM-21 Grad on KrAZ-260 chassis
 EOV-4422 (ЭОВ-4422) - military excavator on KrAZ-260 chassis
 ТММ-3M1 - bridgelayer on KrAZ-260 chassis, since 1988

Operators

Current operators
 
 
 
 Armed Forces of Ukraine
 Ministry of Internal Affairs - in March 2015 one KrAZ-260 armored guntruck was built for "Sokol" rapid response police unit

Former operators
 
  - Armed Forces of Belarus
  - National People's Army
  - Egyptian Armed Forces
  - 300 KrAZ-260 military trucks were sold to Indian Armed Forces

References

KrAZ vehicles
Military trucks of the Soviet Union
Military trucks of Ukraine
Military vehicles introduced in the 1970s